The men's marathon at the 2010 Commonwealth Games was held as part of the athletics programme at the Jawaharlal Nehru Stadium on Thursday 14 October 2010.

Records

Results

References
2010 Commonwealth Games - Athletics

Men's marathon
2010
Commonwealth
2010 Commonwealth Games